Red Rubber Ball is the debut album by The Cyrkle and was released in 1966, on Columbia Records CS 9344 (stereo) and CL 2544 (Mono). It reached #47 on the Billboard Top LPs chart.

The album featured two singles: "Red Rubber Ball", which reached #2 on the Billboard Hot 100, and "Turn-Down Day", which reached #16.  The song "Money to Burn" was later featured as the B-side to their 1966 single "Please Don't Ever Leave Me".

Allmusic gives the album a 3-star rating.

Track listing

Side 1
 "Red Rubber Ball" (Paul Simon, Bruce Woodley) – 2:17
 "Why Can't You Give Me What I Want" (Stephen Friedland, Tom Dawes) – 2:27
 "Baby, You're Free" (Bob Crewe, Gary Weston) – 2:42
 "Big Little Woman" (Don Dannemann, Dawes) – 2:28
 "Cloudy" (Paul Simon, Bruce Woodley) – 2:15
 "Cry" (Dannemann, Dawes) – 2:38

Side 2
 "Turn-Down Day" (Jerry Keller, David Blume) – 2:32
 "There's a Fire in the Fireplace" (Friedland) – 2:24
 "Bony Moronie" (Larry Williams) – 2:32
 "How Can I Leave Her" (Dannemann, Dawes) – 2:35
 "Money to Burn" (Dannemann, Dawes) – 3:05

A reissue on CD added bonus tracks including demo recordings.

Personnel
Adapted from the album's credits.

Musicians
Don Dannemann – vocals (lead: 5, 6); rhythm guitar 
Tom Dawes – guitar, sitar, bass, harmonica, castanets, vocals (lead: 4)
Marty Fried – drums
John Simon – organ (calliope) (track 1)

Production
John Simon – producer, arranger, conductor
Eddie Smith – engineer
Gordy Clark – engineer
Stanley Weiss – engineer
The Cyrkle – arranger, conductor

Charts

Singles

References

1966 debut albums
Albums produced by John Simon (record producer)
Columbia Records albums